Bureya Nature Reserve is a protected area (Zapovednik) about 200 km northwest of the city of Khabarovsk, in the Verkhnebureinsky District of Khabarovsk Krai, in the Russian Far East. The territory is one of mountain tundra, rivers and lakes, and taiga forests. It includes the headwaters of the left and right tributaries of the Bureya River, part of the lower Amur River basin.

Topography
The Bureya Reserve covers the Left Bureya and Right Bureya River, which combine into the Bureya River as it flows south into the Amur River. It is located in the central and southern part of the  Dusse-Alin. The area is surrounded by mountain ranges - the Ezop Range to the northwest, the Yam-Alin to the north and the Bureya Range to the south. The tops of the river valleys are often convex-shaped bald mountains.

The headwaters of many streams are glacial cirques, and lower levels along the rivers feature floodplains and lakes; in between the river valleys are generally too steep for terraces and the tributaries of the Bureya are often in rapids.  Because the winters are relatively dry, the Spring floods are small; the summer floods are larger due to the seasonal rains.  The reserve is remote: the closest town, Sophisk, is 40 km west of the border.  There are no roads in the reserve.

Climate and Ecoregion
Bureya is the largest protected area in the "Okhotsk-Manchurian taiga" ecoregion.  This region of coniferous taiga is at the northernmost extent of Manchurian flora communities, while also supporting the southwestern range of Okhostsk-Kamchatka/Beringia communities.  It is affected by the climatic influence of the Pacific Ocean, which causes warmer winters and cooler summers than areas further from the ocean.  The reserve is important for large mammals including bear, wolverine and sable.

Bureya has a subarctic climate (Köppen climate classification Dwc). characterized by cool summers, and very dry cold winters, moderated slightly in the case of Bureya by the relative proximity of the ocean.

Flora and fauna
The Bureya Reserve has never been subject to the commercial harvesting of timber; any clearing of tree cover has come from natural causes (fires, landslides).  The peaks are bare rock with lichen, below that is a zone of alpine meadows.   Below 1,100 meters the forest zone begins; the middle slopes are covered with larch forests, spruce-fir forests, thickets of cedar, and on the lowest level there are floodplain intra-zonal forests.  The animals are represented by the typical Okhotsk-Kamchatka forest species, including brown bear, ermine, sable, hare, squirrel, and wolverine.  Upper elevations feature alpine species such as ptarmigan and pika.  The reserve has recorded 190 species of birds, with 89 known to nest in the territory.

Management
The reserve has a visitor center and nature museum open to the public.  The park sponsors 3-hour helicopter tours of the territory, rafting trips on the Right Bureya River, and allows limited access to three hiking trails in supervised groups with permits.  The hiking trails are to notable sights - Bear Lake, Lake Korbohon, "The Kings Highway", and waterfalls of the Kuraygagna River.

See also
 National parks of Russia
 Nature reserves of Russia ('zapovedniks')
 Protected areas of Russia

References

External links
 Official Website of Bureinsky Nature Reserve (In English)
 Bureinsky, at Protected Planet.net

Nature reserves in Russia
Protected areas established in 1987
1987 establishments in Russia
Geography of Khabarovsk Krai
Tourist attractions in Khabarovsk Krai
Zapovednik